Daryl Sams, known professionally as Edgar Allen Floe is a hip hop artist from North Carolina and a member of Justus League and The Undefined. His name is a play on words of the name of the famous writer, Edgar Allan Poe.

Biography
Floe's early ambition in hip hop was to become a DJ rather than an MC, but hearing his uncle playing records by the likes of Rakim and Ice Cube led to Floe writing his first lyrics at the age of 14. Mal Demolish, Floe's partner in the group The Undefined, gave him this name in 1996, and Floe stuck with it saying, "Edgar Allan Poe was a well-respected writer and storyteller. I tried to incorporate that into my standpoint. He was a dope writer; I'm trying to be a well respected and dope writer, so it all goes hand in hand." He has released one EP, True Links (2005) and two mixtapes, Floe Almighty (2006, with a remixed version released later) and The Road to The Streetwise (2008). All contain production from Khrysis and 9th Wonder. Floe also produces on these albums under the alias SliceMysta. Floe Almighty received mixed reviews from critics, several frustrated at the delays in releasing his first album.

Floe released his first full-length album, The Streetwise LP, on October 28, 2008, on his own record label, MCEO Records, just as True Links was. The Streetwise LP has guest appearances by Median, L.E.G.A.C.Y. and Sean Boog of The Away Team, and was positively received by critics, with one writing, "Floe raps from a pulpit of authority that not many emcees rival." He is planning to release a project with Mal Demolish.

Floe worked as a consultant in Artist development for 9th Wonder's Jamla Records label.

Floe opened his new website, eafloe.com, on his birthday in 2012. The site included Floe's music catalog, as well as articles pertaining to health, wealth, self-knowledge, the music business and other topics.  The site was taken down for some time, but is now revamped and reactivated on his birthday in 2021.

Discography

Solo albums
 True Links EP (2005) MCEO
 Floe Almighty (mixtape) (2006) Shaman Work Recordings
 Floe Almighty The Remixture (2007) MCEO
 Road to the Streetwise LP (mixtape) (2008)
 The Streetwise LP (2008) MCEO
 Floetry In Motion [digital] (2012) MCEO / Mass Media

Group albums
 Plan U [with The Undefined]

Singles
"The Torch" (2006)

References

External links
eafloe.com
"RapTalk.net Exclusive Q&A Interview Session w/ Edgar Allen Floe", RapTalk.net
Wilson, Simone (2008) "Edgar Allen Floe The Streetwise LP", UCSD Guardian

1978 births
Living people
Rappers from North Carolina
Musicians from Raleigh, North Carolina
21st-century American rappers